Warrawee  is a suburb on the Upper North Shore of Sydney in the state of New South Wales, Australia. Warrawee is located 17 kilometres north-west of the Sydney Central Business District in the local government area of Ku-ring-gai Council. Warrawee is predominantly a small residential suburb with few commercial entities. Notably, its railway station provides no commercial activity which is uncommon in the Sydney train network.

This should not be confused with Wirawee, the fictional small country town in the Tomorrow series of books for young people by John Marsden and the film derived from the first book, Tomorrow, When the War Began (2010).

History
Warrawee is believed to have come from an Aboriginal word meaning rest a while, stop here or to stand.

The suburb is rich in architectural history, with a number of houses designed by prominent architects.

The earliest significant homes were Pibrac (1888), Cheddington (1890) and Wirepe (1893), all very fine houses.

In 1888, the public servant and patron of exploration Frederick Ecclestone du Faur built his house Pibrac in Pibrac Avenue. The house was designed by John Horbury Hunt, a Canadian architect who settled in Australia and favoured the Arts and Crafts style, as well as the North American Shingle style, which he introduced to Australia. Later alterations were carried out by B.J. Waterhouse. The house is composed predominantly of timber, with extensive use of timber shingles, on a sandstone base. It is considered a good example of Hunt's work and is listed on the Register of the National Estate.

Cheddington, the oldest home in established Hastings Road, is also attributed to Horbury Hunt, of brick and slate, with characteristic shingling.

Wirepe, designed by M.B. Halligan for architect Walter Traill, used deep verandahs and high ceilings to elicit a homestead atmosphere, with fine corbelled chimneys and cedar shingles. The brickwork is of Colonial Bond design, and the house sits at the heart of the Ku-ring-gai heritage precinct on Hastings Road.

Upton Grey (now Kooyong) was built in 1894 to a John Sulman design; its English features are a local landmark. Across the century it has served as a government social services home, a CSIRO field station, and a boarding house for Knox Grammar School. It is now in private hands and retains features replicated at Sulman's important Ingleholme.

"Exley House" at Finlay Road Warrawee, was designed by Harry Seidler in 1957 for Cecil Exley – an engineer with the Sydney Water Board – and his wife. 
The three bedrooms, two bathroom home is the only red-brick single storey dwelling that Harry Seidler ever designed and the only one still in its original condition.

As all North Shore suburbs with aboriginal names, Warrawee was the name of a railway station which became attached to the surrounding suburb. Warrawee had developed in the 1900s as an exclusive residential district with no shops, offices, post office, public school, churches or through roads. All the blocks were kept to between one and four acres and the form of houses tightly controlled. Joseph Beresford Grant used his money to guarantee the exclusiveness of the development, and also ensured that there were no shops around the area.

Transport

The Pacific Highway is the main arterial road. Warrawee railway station is on the North Shore & Western Line of the Sydney Trains network. The railway station built in 1900 was the last one built on the North Shore Line before it was extended to North Sydney. Local residents had to fight the railway commissioners for a railway station, that is only one kilometre from Wahroonga.

Demographics 

Of these:

Age distribution: The median age of Warrawee residents was 41 years. Children aged under 15 years made up 18.6% of the population and people aged 65 years and over made up 15.5% of the population.
Ethnic diversity: More than half (60.9%) of residents were born in Australia, compared to the national average of 66.7%; the next most common countries of birth were England 7%, China 5.6%, South Africa 2.9%, Korea 2.6% and India 2.2%. The most common ancestries in Warrawee were English 27.8%, Australian 19.8%, Chinese 8.9%, Scottish 8.1% and Irish 7.8%.
Finances: The median weekly household income was $3,085, more than double the national median of $1,438. Real estate values were correspondingly high: the median monthly mortgage repayments were $3,000 compared to the national median of $1,755. 
 Housing  The majority (84.6%) of private dwellings were family households, 13.7% were single person households and 1.6% were group households. Separate houses accounted for 70.2% of dwellings, while 29.8% were flats or apartments and less than 0.0% were semi-detached.

Schools
Warrawee Public School is a primary school situated about 0.5 kilometres to the south of the station in Turramurra, on the Pacific Highway. According to the school's website, it was established in 1906. 

Knox Grammar School is predominately in the suburb of Warrawee, and sits no more than 200m from Warrawee railway station. The school lists its address as Wahroonga since the Administration Office is situated within that suburb.

Notable residents
 Joseph Beresford Grant (1877–1942), developer and investor in Warrawee as an exclusive residential area. He lived from 1913 in Rowerdennan, Warrawee Avenue.
 Eleanor Cullis-Hill (1913–2001), architect and daughter of Joseph Beresford Grant
 Sir Charles Mackellar and his daughter, poet Dorothea Mackellar
 Olive Fitzhardinge, resident 1917–1937, breeder of the rose 'Warrawee' especially, lived with Dr Fitzhardinge at Bridge End, 1 Warrawee Avenue.
 Kandiah Kamalesvaran known as Kamahl, singer
 Sir John Seymour Proud (1907–1997)

References

http://www.eoas.info/biogs/P004777b.htm

External links

  [CC-By-SA]

Suburbs of Sydney
Ku-ring-gai Council